Ferula cypria, the Cyprus fennel, is an erect perennial herb up to 1 m high with sulcate stems. The compound alternate leaves are hairless and 4-pinnate, 25-45 x 20–30 cm, final segments are very small, linear and acute. The inconspicuous yellowish flowers are repeatedly branched in pyramidal inflorescences. Flowers from May to June. The fruit is a dry hairless schizocarp.

Habitat
Dry rocky hillsides mostly on limestone at 200–600 m altitude.

Distribution
It is endemic to Cyprus where it is considered a rare species and seems to be restricted to certain areas in the Pentadaktylos Range-Ayios Ilarionas, Pano Dhikomo, Lefkoniko. It is also found in Philani and Lazanias.

References
 The Endemic Plants of Cyprus, Texts: Takis Ch. Tsintides, Photographs: Laizos Kourtellarides, Cyprus Association of Professional Foresters, Bank of Cyprus Group, Nicosia 1998,

External links
http://herbaryum.neu.edu.tr/content/resimler/Apiaceae-Umbelliferae/Ferulago cypria.jpg
http://herbaryum.neu.edu.tr/content/resimler/Apiaceae-Umbelliferae/Ferula cypria.JPG
http://www.theplantlist.org/tpl/record/kew-2808384

cypria
Endemic flora of Cyprus